Ian Karkull is a supervillain in comic books published by DC Comics. He first appeared in More Fun Comics #69 (August 1941) as a foe of the sorcerer Doctor Fate. He later became a recurring foe of the All-Star Squadron and the Justice Society of America, beginning in All-Star Squadron Annual #3.

Publication history
Ian Karkull first appeared in More Fun Comics #69 and was created by Gardner Fox and Howard Sherman.

Fictional character biography
In the late 1930s, Ian Karkull was a scientist and archaeologist working in the Sahara Desert with partner Everett Dahlen. The two sought the lost city of Ragnor, a mystic city rumored to possess great wealth and a knowledge of dark powers. Having found it, the two came upon a ruby of incredible size and value and immediately began to quarrel over it. Dahlen stunned Karkull with a savage blow and left him to die in the hidden city. Abandoned in the lost city for days, Karkull learned an undisclosed array of secrets and magics that he carried with him back to America when he was finally rescued by nomadic Arabs. 

Arriving in New York, Karkull built a machine based on what he had learned. With it, he could turn men into intangible shadows. His initial goals were twofold: to avenge himself on Everett Dahlen and build a cache of wealth to launch the next phase of his criminal career. His first goal was easily met, slaying Dahlen with the aide of a shadowy assassin. Karkull's plans were complicated however, when the murder attracted the attention of Doctor Fate. Fate pursued the shadow-men on their next outing at a local bank and confronted Karkull in his lair. To elude the mage, Karkull transformed himself into a shadow. The criminal had outsmarted himself, since Dr. Fate then promptly destroyed the machine that would return him to human form. After lecturing Karkull on the penalties of an evil life, Fate left the shadow to his own devices.

For an undetermined period, Karkull wandered the Earth, plotting his revenge. At some point he was contacted by the astral form of the arch-mage Wotan, another enemy of Dr. Fate. Wotan educated Karkull on the magicks needed to free his body from the deep tomb in which Fate had trapped him. The two then relocated to a hidden city in the Arctic to gather their strength. Their plans came to the attention of Dr. Fate when they destroyed an expedition of U.S. Navy scientists who came too close to their lair. Tracking the villains across the frozen wasteland, Fate confronted his two foes only to be captured. His release was accomplished via a surprise assault by the Navy, led by the sole survivor of the doomed expedition. The men were no match for the powerful weaponry employed by Karkull and Wotan but distracted them long enough for the mage to escape. After ensuring the safety of the sailors, Fate turned his full wrath on the villains, reflecting their own device against them. Seeing them apparently destroyed, Fate left the Arctic city to burn to the ground.

Karkull was last seen manipulating Obsidian, to gain access to, and subsequently rule the shadow lands; the same story revealed that, during a World War II era confrontation between Karkull and the rest of the Justice Society, exposure to Karkull's shadow energies slowed down the aging processes of much of the JSA, accounting for their good physical health despite their chronological ages. Karkull had seemingly been corrupting Obsidian for months, in an effort to get revenge on his enemies in the Justice Society. Obsidian then killed Karkull, using his energies to grow to massive size to combat Alan Scott.

In other media

Television
 Karkull appears in the Superman: The Animated Series episode "The Hand of Fate", voiced by Ted Levine. This version is a powerful Cthulhu-like being accidentally freed when an unnamed thief robs a mystical artifact from a museum. Karkull possesses the body of the thief and begins transforming people into his demon slaves, eventually taking over and transforming the Daily Planet building into a portal into the underworld. When Karkull proved too much for Superman, he ends up gaining the assistance of Doctor Fate to fight him. Karkull is eventually defeated by Superman and Doctor Fate and sealed into a clay tablet just as the police arrive.

References

DC Comics supervillains
DC Comics metahumans
DC Comics scientists
Fictional archaeologists
DC Comics characters who use magic
Comics characters introduced in 1941
Characters created by Gardner Fox
Fictional characters who can manipulate darkness or shadows
Fictional characters with slowed ageing
Golden Age supervillains